Madhubhai Jeliyabhai Bhoye is politician from Gujarat. He is a member of the Indian National Congress Party.

In 2002, he was elected from Dang district's Dangs-Bansda assembly constituency of Gujarat.

References

Living people
Gujarat MLAs 2002–2007
Indian National Congress politicians
People from Dang district, India
Year of birth missing (living people)
Indian National Congress politicians from Gujarat